Geoffrey Ernest Stedman (born April 1, 1943) is a New Zealand physicist, with research interests including the foundations of relativity, symmetry in quantum mechanics, and ring lasers.

Education and career 
Born in 1943, Stedman attended the University of Canterbury, graduating with a BSc(Hons) in physics in 1965. He subsequently went to Queen Mary College, University of London, where he completed his PhD under Douglas Newman in 1968. After post-doctoral research, also at Queen Mary, Stedman returned to lecture at Canterbury in 1971. He retired in 2003 and was granted the title of emeritus professor.

He was elected a Fellow of the Royal Society of New Zealand in 1989, and in 1994 he won the society's Hector Medal. He won the Canterbury Research Medal in 2001.

Bibliography

Books

Selected papers
 Stedman, G. E. "Ring-laser tests of fundamental physics and geophysics." Reports on progress in physics 60, no. 6 (1997): 615.
 Pancha, Aasha, T. H. Webb, G. E. Stedman, D. P. McLeod, and K. U. Schreiber. "Ring laser detection of rotations from teleseismic waves." Geophysical Research Letters 27, no. 21 (2000): 3553–3556.
 Rowe, Clive H., Ulrich K. Schreiber, Steven J. Cooper, B. Tom King, Morrie Poulton, and Geoffrey E. Stedman. "Design and operation of a very large ring laser gyroscope." Applied optics 38, no. 12 (1999): 2516–2523.
 Schreiber, Ulrich K., Clive H. Rowe, Douglas N. Wright, Steven J. Cooper, and Geoffrey E. Stedman. "Precision stabilization of the optical frequency in a large ring laser gyroscope." Applied optics 37, no. 36 (1998): 8371–8381.

References

External links
 Google Scholar 
 Institutional homepage

1943 births
Living people
University of Canterbury alumni
Alumni of Queen Mary University of London
New Zealand physicists
Academic staff of the University of Canterbury
Fellows of the Royal Society of New Zealand
20th-century New Zealand scientists
21st-century New Zealand scientists
People from Christchurch